Ulinzi Stars Football Club is an association football club based in Nakuru, Kenya. They compete in the Kenyan Premier League, where they won three consecutive titles from 2003 to 2005. They are the only team to have done so, along with AFC Leopards and Gor Mahia, and won their most recent league title in 2010.

History
Ulinzi Stars represent Kenya's Defence forces (the Kenya Army, the Airforce  and the Kenya Navy). It was formed in 1995 when several military sides were combined. These teams were:
Waterworks
Scarlet (Third Battalion of the Kenya Rifles, based in Lanet, Nakuru),
Kahawa United (Kahawa Barracks, Kahawa, Nairobi)
Silver Strikers (12th Engineers, Thika),
Kenya Navy (Mombasa)
Spitfire (Kenya Air Force, Moi Air Base, Nairobi).

Ulinzi have played in the Afraha Stadium since 2004, after moving from Thika. They won the Kenyan Sports Team of the Year award in 2010.

The team doubles as the Kenya national military football team, which qualified for the 2011 Military World Games.

Other clubs
Ulinzi used to have a successful basketball team, Ulinzi Warriors, until 2007 when it was disbanded, despite being the reigning national champion, having won five consecutive league titles. They also had a rugby team, Ulinzi RFC, but was disbanded. They also had volleyball and handball teams.

Achievements
Kenyan Premier League: 4
2003, 2004, 2005, 2010

KPL Top 8 Cup: 1
2011

Performance in CAF competitions
CAF Champions League: 2 appearances
2004 – First Round
2011 – Preliminary Round

References

External links
 Ulinzi Stars – Official Website

Kenyan Premier League clubs
Football clubs in Kenya
Sport in Rift Valley Province
Nakuru
Sport in Central Province (Kenya)
Military of Kenya
Military association football clubs in Kenya
1995 establishments in Kenya